The Argentine presidential election of 1904 was held on 10 April to choose the president of Argentina. Manuel Quintana was elected president.

Background

Riding high after another term of prosperity and important diplomatic accomplishments such as the May 1902 Pact with neighboring Chile over a border dispute and Foreign Minister Luis Drago's settlement of imminent war between the German Empire and Venezuela, President Roca enlisted Congressman Manuel Quintana as the PAN standard bearer. Within the PAN itself, some dissent was evident over Roca's dominance. These voices rallied behind former Presidents Carlos Pellegrini (as an Autonomist) and José Evaristo Uriburu (as a Republican). The UCR maintained its boycott, and the aging Quintana was selected by the electoral college on 12 June 1904.

The year's legislative elections were more historically significant than the headline presidential selection: the Buenos Aires district of La Boca elected Alfredo Palacios, the first Socialist Congressman in the western hemisphere.

Results

Results by Province

Notes

References
 
 

 

1904 elections in South America
1904 in Argentina
1904
Elections in Argentina